María Teresa Rojas Rabiela (born December 17, 1947) is an ethnologist, ethnohistorian, Emeritus National Resercher  and Mexican academic, specializing in Chinampas of Mexico's Basin, history of agriculture, hydraulics, technology, and labor organization in Mesoamerica during pre-Columbian and colonial eras, as well as historical photography of Mexico's peasants and indigenous people. She is recognized as a pioneer in historical studies on earthquakes in Mexico. From 2018 to 2021, Rojas Rabiela was involved in the restoration of the section of the pre-Hispanic aqueduct of Tetzcotzinco, Texcoco, known as El caño quebrado (the broken pipe).

Education and academia 
She received her doctoral degree from Universidad Iberoamericana, with the thesis La agricultura mesoamericana en el siglo XVI (English: Mesoamerican Agriculture in the 16th century), directed by Pedro Carrasco. She studied under Guillermo Bonfil Batalla, Pedro Armillas, Pedro Carrasco and William T. Sanders. 

In 1973, she was appointed research professor at Centro de Investigaciones y Estudios Superiores en Antropología Social (English: Higher Anthropology Research and Studies Center, CIESAS, for its acronym in Spanish), and its CEO from 1990 to 1996.

Career 

Rabiela has held managerial, advisory, academic and representative positions at Centro de Investigaciones y Estudios Superiores en Antropología Social, Mexico; Foro Consultivo Científico y Tecnológico  (Scientific and Technological Consultative Forum) Mexico; Academia Mexicana de Ciencias (Mexican Academy of Science); Colegio de Etnólogos y Antropólogos Sociales (Ethnologists and Social Anthropologists Society) Mexico; Sistema Nacional de Investigadores (National System of Researchers) Mexico; the UNAM Instituto de Investigaciones Antropológicas (Institute of Anthropological Research-UNAM); the Archivo General de la Nación (Nation's General Archive) Mexico; Universidad Iberoamericana, El Colegio de México, El Colegio de San Luis and El Colegio de Michoacán.

Rabiela is the Water's Historical Archive's founder (National Water Commission, Mexico) and has directed the Agrarian General Archive project development (CIESAS- Registro Nacional Agrario, Mexico). 

She has been editor of Historia de los Pueblos Indígenas de México (Mexico's Indigenous Peoples History) collection (twenty four volumes) with Mario Humberto Ruz Sosa, CIESAS - Comisión Nacional para el Desarrollo de los Pueblos Indígenas, Mexico; of Colección Agraria ( Agrarian Collection, seventeen volumes) CIESAS-Registro Nacional Agrario, Mexico; of Serie Biografías of Colegio de Etnólogos y Antropólogos Sociales; and the "Iconografía de la Luz" (Iconography of Light) photolibrary Nacho López electronic catalog, with Ignacio Gutiérrez Ruvalcaba, CIESAS-CDI in fifty five volumes.

Publications

Books

References

External links 
 Review of Cultura Hidráulica y Simbolismo Mesoamericano del Agua en el México Prehispánico (Hydraulic Culture and Mesoamerican Symbolism of Water in Pre-Hispanic Mexico. In Spanish) El Colegio de Michoacán.
 Review of Vidas y bienes olvidados. Testamentos indígenas novohispanos (Forgotten lives and goods. Novohispano indigenous wills.) In Spanish.
 Publican edición facsimilar del Catálogo de la Colección de Antropología del Museo Nacional (Published facsimile edition of the Catalog of the Anthropology Collection of the National Museum, Mexico. In Spanish)

1947 births
Living people
Scientists from Mexico City
Writers from Mexico City
Mexican anthropologists
Mexican women anthropologists
20th-century Mexican scientists
20th-century Mexican women scientists
21st-century Mexican women scientists
Women ethnologists
Social anthropologists
Science writers
Women science writers
20th-century anthropologists
21st-century anthropologists
20th-century Mexican writers
21st-century Mexican women writers
21st-century Mexican scientists
Ethnologists
National School of Anthropology and History alumni
Universidad Iberoamericana alumni